Norma Elizabeth Huembes Salazar (born May 10, 1998) is a Nicaraguan model, public accountant, and beauty pageant titleholder who was crowned Miss Nicaragua 2022 on August 6, 2022, in the Crown Plaza Hotel and Convention Center in Managua, Nicaragua. She will represent Nicaragua at Miss Universe 2022 in the 71st annual pageant, Huembes becomes the 41st Miss Nicaragua titleholder the first one in 1955.

Early life and education 
Huembes was born on May 11, 1998, in San Marcos, Nicaragua. She studied at the Universidad Centroamericana and pursued a degree in public accounting. At the same time she pursued a modeling career.

Pageantry

Miss Teen Nicaragua 2015 

Huembes' first beauty pageant was in 2015 when she came fourth in Miss Teen Nicaragua 2015 .

Miss Nicaragua 2022

On August 6, 2022, representing San Marcos, Carazo, Huembes won the Miss Nicaragua 2022 crown becoming the third Carazian woman to get the crown the last one was Nastassja Bolivar in 2013.

Miss Universe 2022

Huembes will represent Nicaragua in the 71st Miss Universe 2022 competing with around 80 women from all over the world.

References

1998 births
Living people
Nicaraguan beauty pageant winners
Nicaraguan models
Miss Universe 2022 contestants